Aliverdi Owshaqi (also Romanized as ‘Alīverdī Owshāqī; also known as ‘Alī Verdī Ūshāghī) is a village in Bastamlu Rural District of the Central District of Khoda Afarin County, East Azerbaijan province, Iran. At the 2006 National Census, its population was 720 in 160 households, when it was in Khoda Afarin District of Kaleybar County. The following census in 2011 counted 749 people in 183 households, by which time the village was in the newly established Khoda Afarin County. The latest census in 2016 showed a population of 675 people in 199 households; it was the largest village in its rural district. The village is populated by the Kurdish Chalabianlu tribe.

References 

Khoda Afarin County

Populated places in East Azerbaijan Province

Populated places in Khoda Afarin County

Kurdish settlements in East Azerbaijan Province